The 2014 New Zealand gallantry awards were announced via a Special Honours List on 9 December 2014, although the identities of all the recipients were not released publicly at the time for security reasons. Subsequently the name of Corporal Steve Askin, previously only referred to as Serviceman D, was revealed on 15 February 2017. All the awards were made in recognition of actions by New Zealand armed forces personnel in Afghanistan during 2011.

New Zealand Gallantry Star (NZGS)
 Corporal David Steven Askin – 1 New Zealand Special Air Service Regiment

 Serviceman J – New Zealand Defence Force

New Zealand Gallantry Decoration (NZGD)
 Serviceman W – New Zealand Defence Force

 Serviceman H – New Zealand Defence Force

New Zealand Gallantry Medal (NZGM)
 Serviceman J – New Zealand Defence Force

 Serviceman D – New Zealand Defence Force

 Serviceman A – New Zealand Defence Force

 Serviceman C – New Zealand Defence Force

 Serviceman S – New Zealand Defence Force

References

New Zealand Royal Honours System
Gallantry awards
Hon
New Zealand gallantry awards